Papyrus 83 (in the Gregory-Aland numbering), designated by 𝔓83, is a copy of the New Testament in Greek. It is a papyrus manuscript of the Gospel of Matthew. The surviving texts of Matthew are verses 20:23-25,30-31; 23:39-24:1,6. The manuscript paleographically has been assigned to the 6th century. It is among only very few New Testament texts on papyrus recovered outside Egypt (in this case from Khirbet Mird in the Judean desert).

 Text 
The Greek text of this codex probably is mixed. Aland placed it in Category III.

 Location 
It is currently housed at the Katholieke Universiteit Leuven Library (P. A. M. Khirbet Mird 16, 29). Transcriptions and photographs have been published by Lakmann.

See also 

 List of New Testament papyri
 Papyrus 84

References 

New Testament papyri
6th-century biblical manuscripts
Gospel of Matthew papyri